Sonia de La Provôté (born 25 December 1968) is a French politician, member of the French Senate. She was elected in 2017 and again in 2020. She represents the department of Calvados.

References
Page on the Senate website

1968 births
Living people
French Senators of the Fifth Republic
20th-century French physicians
Politicians from Caen
University of Caen Normandy alumni
Union of Democrats and Independents politicians
The Centrists politicians
Senators of Calvados (department)
Physicians from Caen